Heyneanine is a Tabernaemontana alkaloid with in vitro antitumor activity. It also inhibits butrylcholinesterase.

See also
 Coronaridine
 Voacangine

References

Indole alkaloids
Heterocyclic compounds with 5 rings